Arnold R. Simpson (born April 26, 1952) is an American politician and a former Democratic member of the Kentucky House of Representatives representing District 65 from January 1995 to 2019, when he retired.

Education
Simpson earned his BA from Kentucky State University and his JD from the University of Kentucky College of Law.

Elections
1994 Simpson won the 1994 Democratic Primary and the November 8, 1994 General election.
1996 Simpson was unopposed for both the 1996 Democratic Primary and the November 5, 1996 General election.
1998 Simpson was unopposed for both the 1998 Democratic Primary and the November 3, 1998 General election.
2000 Simpson was unopposed for both the 2000 Democratic Primary and the November 7, 2000 General election, winning with 5,738 votes.
2002 Simpson was unopposed for both the 2002 Democratic Primary and the November 5, 2002 General election, winning with 4,112 votes.
2004 Simpson was unopposed for both the 2004 Democratic Primary and the November 2, 2004 General election, winning with 7,739 votes.
2006 Simpson was unopposed for the 2006 Democratic Primary and won the November 7, 2006 General election with 4,628 votes (65.5%) against Republican nominee Ray Murphy.
2008 Simpson was unopposed for both the 2008 Democratic Primary and the November 4, 2008 General election, winning with 9,285 votes.
2010 Simpson was unopposed for both the May 18, 2010 Democratic Primary and the November 2, 2010 General election, winning with 5,022 votes.
2012 Simpson was unopposed for both the May 22, 2012 Democratic Primary and the November 6, 2012 General election, winning with 8,293 votes.

References

External links
Official page at the Kentucky General Assembly
Campaign site

Arnold Simpson at Ballotpedia
Arnold R. Simpson at OpenSecrets

Place of birth missing (living people)
1952 births
Living people
African-American state legislators in Kentucky
Kentucky lawyers
Kentucky State University alumni
Democratic Party members of the Kentucky House of Representatives
Politicians from Covington, Kentucky
University of Kentucky College of Law alumni
21st-century American politicians
21st-century African-American politicians
20th-century African-American people